The Hambidge Center Historic District is a  historic district near the community of Dillard in Rabun County, Georgia, United States.

Located west of Dillard on Betty's Creek Rd., Hambidge Center was listed on the National Register of Historic Places in 1982.  The district comprises 25 separate contributing properties, including a log cabin dating to the 1830s.

References

Historic districts on the National Register of Historic Places in Georgia (U.S. state)
National Register of Historic Places in Rabun County, Georgia